A Fickle Sonance is an album by American saxophonist Jackie McLean recorded in 1961 and released on the Blue Note label. It features McLean in a quintet with trumpeter Tommy Turrentine, pianist Sonny Clark, bassist Butch Warren and drummer Billy Higgins.

The "sonance" of the album’s title is an obsolete word for a sound or a tune.

The opening track "Five Will Get You Ten" was originally credited to pianist Clark, but later co-writing credited was given to Thelonious Monk. The song is now believed to have been written solely by Monk as "Two Timer", though never recorded by him. The song's lead sheet was allegedly discovered by Clark in Monk's home, or the home of jazz patroness Pannonica de Koenigswarter, and passed off as a Clark tune to pay for his drug addiction. The song's debut recording under its original title was by Monk's son, T. S. Monk on his 1997 album Monk on Monk.

Reception

The AllMusic review by Al Campbell awarded the album 3 stars and stated: 

In a 2016 review flophouse.com said:

Track listing

Personnel
Jackie McLean – alto saxophone
Tommy Turrentine – trumpet
Sonny Clark – piano
Butch Warren – bass
Billy Higgins – drums

References

Blue Note Records albums
Jackie McLean albums
1962 albums
Albums produced by Alfred Lion
Albums recorded at Van Gelder Studio
Instrumental albums